Yevgenia Vladimirovna Dobrovolskaya (born 26 December 1964) is a Soviet and Russian actress of theater and cinema, People's Artist of the Russian Federation (2005). Laureate of the Nika Award (2001)  and Golden Eagle Award (2007).

Biography 
Dobrovolskaya was born on 26 December 1964 in Moscow, Russian SFSR, Soviet Union.

In 1987 she graduated from GITIS (course of Lyudmila Kasatkina and Sergey Kolosov), and was admitted to the Maxim Gorky Moscow Art Theater.

She made her debut in the movie in 1983 in the  Pavel Chukhrai film Cage for Canaries.

In 2014, she took part in an advertising campaign absorbing underwear Depend.

Personal life 
 First husband —  Vyacheslav Baranov (1958-2012), actor.
Son Stepan (born 1 November 1986).
 Second husband —  Mikhail Yefremov,  actor (married from January 1990 to December 1997).
 Son Nikolai (born 16 August 1991).
 Son Yan (born 19 July 2002)   from extramarital affairs with the actor Yaroslav Boyko.
 Third husband —  Dmitry Manannikov,  cinematographer (married since 2009).
 Daughter Anastasia (born 6 February 2009).

Selected filmography 
 Moonzund (1987) as Irina Artenyeva
 Mechanical Suite (2001) as Lyuba
 Deadly Force (2003) as Marina Korotkova
 Mars (2004) as Galina
 The Wedding Chest (2005) as apothecary
  Actress (2007) as Аnnа
The Irony of Fate 2 (2007) as  Snegurochka
 The Tale of Soldier Fedot, The Daring Fellow (2008) as nurse of   king (voice)
   Jolly Fellows (2009) as Valentina
 Heavenly Court (2011) as Anna Vladimirovna, witness
 Guys from Mars (2011) as Yulia's mother
 The White Guard (2012) as Vanda
 Pyotr Leschenko. Everything That Was... (2013) as Maria Burenina

References

External links

 Евгения Добровольская на сайте «Кино России»

1964 births
Living people
Actresses from Moscow
Russian film actresses
Soviet film actresses
Russian stage actresses
Soviet stage actresses
Russian television actresses
Soviet actresses
20th-century Russian actresses
21st-century Russian actresses
Honored Artists of the Russian Federation
People's Artists of Russia
Recipients of the Nika Award
Russian Academy of Theatre Arts alumni
Russian voice actresses